
Gmina Gorzków is a rural gmina (administrative district) in Krasnystaw County, Lublin Voivodeship, in eastern Poland.

Villages
Gmina Gorzków contains the villages and settlements of Antoniówka, Baranica, Bobrowe, Bogusław, Borów, Borów-Kolonia, Borsuk, Chorupnik, Czysta Dębina, Czysta Dębina-Kolonia, Felicjan, Góry, Gorzków, Gorzków-Wieś, Józefów, Olesin, Orchowiec, Piaski Szlacheckie, Widniówka, Wielkopole, Wielobycz, Wiśniów and Zamostek.

Neighbouring gminas
Gmina Gorzków is bordered by the gminas of Izbica, Krasnystaw, Łopiennik Górny, Rudnik, Rybczewice and Żółkiewka.

References
Polish official population figures 2006

Gorzkow
Krasnystaw County